Lytta rathvoni is a species of blister beetle in the family Meloidae. It is found in North America. The species is named for Simon Rathvon, a 19th-century American entomologist.

References

Further reading

 
 

Meloidae
Articles created by Qbugbot
Beetles described in 1853